Charlestown or Charles Town may refer to:

Places

Australia
Charlestown, New South Wales
 Electoral district of Charlestown, an electoral district in the New South Wales Legislative Assembly including the area
 Charlestown, Queensland

Ireland
Charlestown, County Mayo
Charlestown Shopping Centre, Dublin

South Africa
Charlestown, KwaZulu-Natal

United Kingdom

England 
Charlestown, Cornwall
Charlestown, Derbyshire
Charlestown, Dorset
Charlestown, Manchester, Greater Manchester
Charlestown, Salford, Greater Manchester, a location
Charlestown, Bradford, West Yorkshire, a location
Charlestown, Calderdale, West Yorkshire, a location

Northern Ireland 

 Bannfoot, County Armagh (also known as Charlestown)

Scotland 
Charlestown, Aberdeen, a location
Charlestown, Aberdeenshire, a location
Charlestown, Fife (also known as Charlestown-on-Forth)
Charlestown, Black Isle, in the Highland council area
Charlestown, Wester Ross, part of Gairloch, in the Highland council area
Charlestown, Moray, a location

United States
Charlestown, Indiana 
Charlestown, Maryland
Charlestown, Boston, Massachusetts, a formerly independent city which is now part of Boston
Charleston, South Carolina, called Charles Town from its founding in 1680 until 1783
 Charlestown, Nebraska
Charlestown, New Hampshire 
 Charlestown (CDP), New Hampshire
 Charlestown, New Jersey
Charlestown Township, Portage County, Ohio
Charlestown, Pennsylvania
Charlestown, Rhode Island
Charlestown (CDP), Rhode Island
Naval Auxiliary Air Station Charlestown
Charles Town, West Virginia, called Charlestown before West Virginia became a state; renamed to avoid confusion with the state capital, Charleston.
Charlestown, Wisconsin

West Indies
Nassau, Bahamas, formerly Charles Town
Charles Town, Jamaica
Charlestown, Nevis
 Charlestown, Saint Vincent and the Grenadines

Other
Charlestown (album), an album by Guy Manning
Charles Town (cricketer) (1796–1845)

See also

Charleston (disambiguation)
Charlton (disambiguation)
Charles Towne (disambiguation)